Trichocoryne is a genus of flowering plants in the tribe Heliantheae within the family Asteraceae.

Species
The only known species is Trichocoryne connata, native to the State of Durango in Mexico.

References 

Flora of Durango
Monotypic Asteraceae genera
Heliantheae